These are the official results of the Women's 400 metres Hurdles event at the 1983 IAAF World Championships in Helsinki, Finland. There were a total number of 31 participating athletes, with four qualifying heats, two semi-finals and the final held on Wednesday 1983-08-10.

Medalists

Records
Existing records at the start of the event.

Final

Semi-finals
Held on Tuesday 1983-08-09

Qualifying heats
Held on Monday 1983-08-08

See also
 1982 Women's European Championships 400m Hurdles (Athens)
 1984 Women's Olympic 400m Hurdles (Los Angeles)
 1986 Women's European Championships 400m Hurdles (Stuttgart)
 1988 Women's Olympic 400m Hurdles (Seoul)

References
 Results

H
400 metres hurdles at the World Athletics Championships
1983 in women's athletics